This list of bridges in Iraq lists bridges of particular historical, scenic, architectural or engineering interest. Road and railway bridges, viaducts, aqueducts and footbridges are included.

Historical and architectural interest bridges

Major road and railway bridges 
This table presents the structures with spans greater than 100 meters (non-exhaustive list).

Notes and references 
 Notes

 Others references

See also 

 Transport in Iraq
 Roads in Iraq
 Rail transport in Iraq
 Geography of Iraq
 List of Roman bridges

External links

Further reading 
 
 

Iraq
 
Bridges
Bridges